Nedin Tucaković (born 3 November 1996) is a Bosnian-American retired footballer who last played as a goalkeeper for Bosnian Premier League club FK Sarajevo.  

After retiring as a player, Tucaković became a goalkeeper coach and started a football academy.

References

External links
Profile - SDSU Aztecs
Profile - SJSU Spartans

1996 births
Living people
People from San Jose, California
Bosnian American
Association football goalkeepers
American soccer players
Bosnia and Herzegovina footballers
San Diego State Aztecs men's soccer players
San Jose State Spartans men's soccer players
FK Sarajevo players
First League of the Federation of Bosnia and Herzegovina players
Premier League of Bosnia and Herzegovina players
De Anza Force players